The Dutch Eerste Divisie in the 1998–99 season was contested by 18 teams. FC Den Bosch won the championship.

New entrants
Relegated from the 1997–98 Eredivisie
 FC Groningen
 FC Volendam

League standings

Promotion/relegation play-offs
In the promotion/relegation competition, eight entrants (six from this league and two from the Eredivisie) entered in two groups. The group winners were promoted to the Eredivisie.

See also
 1998–99 Eredivisie
 1998–99 KNVB Cup

References
Netherlands - List of final tables (RSSSF)

Eerste Divisie seasons
2
Neth